The Milky Way is a 1936 American comedy film starring Harold Lloyd. Directed by comedy veteran Leo McCarey, the film was written by Grover Jones, Frank Butler and Richard Connell based on a play of the same name by Lynn Root and Harry Clork that was presented on Broadway in 1934.

An example of the popular screwball comedy genre of the time, and critically Harold Lloyd's most successful talkie, it tells the story of a Brooklyn milkman who becomes middleweight boxing champion. The Milky Way features supporting performances by Adolphe Menjou and Verree Teasdale and marks the film debut of Anthony Quinn with a small uncredited role.

Plot
Timid milkman Burleigh Sullivan works for the American company Sunflower Dairies. Two drunk men try to chat up Mae, Burleigh's sister, and he chances by. In an ensuing brawl, Speed McFarland, the world middleweight champion, gets knocked out (but Burleigh never in fact threw a punch; he merely ducked to get out of the way of a punch which brought the champ down).

McFarland's boss, the crooked Gabby Sloan, promotes Sullivan in a series of fixed fights that will culminate in him being knocked out in a real fight with McFarland. Against all the odds, Sullivan triumphs and becomes world champion.

Cast
 Harold Lloyd as Burleigh "Tiger" Sullivan
 Adolphe Menjou as Gabby Sloan (Speed's manager)
 Verree Teasdale as Ann Westley
 Helen Mack as Mae Sullivan (Burleigh's sister)
 William Gargan as Speed McFarland (middleweight champ)
 George Barbier as Wilbur Austin
 Dorothy Wilson as Polly Pringle
 Lionel Stander as Spider Schultz (Speed's bodyguard)
 Charles Lane as Willard
 Marjorie Gateson as Mrs. E. Winthrop Lemoyne

Cast notes:
 Anthony Quinn has an uncredited bit part as an extra, his first film appearance.
 Thomas A. Curran, the early American silent film star, plays an uncredited bit part.

Production
The Milky Way had originally been optioned as a vehicle for Jack Oakie with Edward Everett Horton and Gertrude Michael in the main supporting roles, but when Oakie was replaced with Harold Lloyd, the role of the manager was to go to William Frawley, because studio executives felt that Lloyd and Horton were too similar in comic style. The part eventually went to Adolphe Menjou. Both Brian Donlevy, who played the role of Speed McFarland on Broadway, and boxer-turned-actor Max Baer were considered for roles in the film, but were not cast. Actress Ida Lupino was to have played Polly Pringle, but withdrew because of illness, to be replaced by Dorothy Wilson. Helen Mack and Verree Teasdale were also replacements, the parts having originally gone to Sally Blane and Gail Patrick. Although they do not appear in the film, the Dionne Quintuplets had been expected to make an appearance.

Filming began on July 22, 1935, but was interrupted by the illnesses of Menjou, Teasdale and director Leo McCarey, who was hospitalized. McCarey's place was taken by his brother Ray McCarey and by veteran director Norman Z. McLeod. During filming, when a suitable white horse for Burleigh could not be found, makeup artists bleached a dark-colored horse blond.

Reception
Writing for The Spectator in 1936, Graham Greene provided a positive review, giving particular praise to Harold Lloyd and Adolphe Menjou. Greene noted that "with the gag-makers at the top of their form and Mr Menjou at the top of his, we have the best 'Harold Lloyd' to date."

Adaptations and remakes
A one-hour radio adaptation was presented on Lux Radio Theatre on November 4, 1935, featuring Charles Butterworth.

When producer Samuel Goldwyn bought the rights to the property in the mid-1940s for his remake, The Kid from Brooklyn (with Danny Kaye in the lead role), he also bought the original negative and almost all existing prints and destroyed them. However, Harold Lloyd had preserved an original nitrate release print, which became the source for the new digital video transfer used by TCM. Lionel Stander played the role of "Spider" Schultz in both versions of the film.

In 2004, the premise of a mild-mannered milkman-turned-boxer would again be used in the mockumentary The Calcium Kid, starring Orlando Bloom.

References

External links

 

 
 
 
 

1936 films
American comedy films
American black-and-white films
American boxing films
Films about cattle
Fictional milkmen
Fictional boxers
1936 comedy films
Films directed by Leo McCarey
Paramount Pictures films
1930s English-language films
1930s American films